This is a list about Buddhist temples in Busan, South Korea.

See also
 List of Buddhist temples in Seoul

Religious buildings and structures in Busan
Busan
Tourist attractions in Busan
Busan
Lists of religious buildings and structures in South Korea